Przemysław Szarek (born 22 April 1996) is a Polish professional footballer who plays as a centre-back for Motor Lublin.

Club career
On 7 August 2020 he signed a two-year contract with Korona Kielce. On 28 February 2022, he left the club by mutual consent.

References

External links

1996 births
Sportspeople from Nowy Sącz
Living people
Polish footballers
Poland youth international footballers
Association football defenders
Sandecja Nowy Sącz players
Bruk-Bet Termalica Nieciecza players
Korona Kielce players
Motor Lublin players
Ekstraklasa players
I liga players
III liga players